The University of Sydney School of Dentistry also known as Sydney Dental School is Australia's first dental school and a constituent body of the University of Sydney, Australia.

Previously the Faculty of Dentistry, the Sydney Dental School joined the newly formed Faculty of Medicine and Health on 30 April 2018. The new faculty was established to ensure the university was best positioned to address the challenges of healthcare in the 21st century.

The Sydney Dental School is based at the Westmead Centre for Oral Health (part of Westmead Hospital), and Sydney Dental Hospital (situated between Chalmers Street and Elizabeth Street opposite the entrance to Central Station).  The Sydney Dental Hospital was the original site of the Sydney Dental School when it was first opened in March 1901. The school also has connections with other local health district dental hospitals, and provides opportunities for students to undertake rural and regional placements.

Professor Heiko Spallek has been Head of School and Dean of the Sydney Dental School since November 2018.

Research 
Dentistry at the University of Sydney is committed to the discovery of new principles and new ideas. The school has an emphasis on 'putting the mouth back into health', that is, viewing oral health as a critical component of overall health. The school's main research areas are population oral health, chronic diseases and ageing well/ageing productively.

Their multidisciplinary research approach brings together the complementary expertise of the University of Sydney's faculties, centres and institutes with that of our affiliated teaching hospitals, institutes and international research partnerships. Their researchers use dental expertise to enhance studies in fundamental cell biology, microbiology, molecular biology and biomechanics.

Study dentistry 
The Sydney Dental School offers two pathways to becoming a dentist:
 Doctor of Dental Medicine – graduate entry
 Double Degree Dentistry (Bachelor of Science (Advanced)/Doctor of Dental Medicine) – for high school leavers with outstanding results.

Study oral health 
The Sydney Dental School offers the Bachelor of Oral Health, a three-year degree for people who are looking to become an Oral Health Therapist.

Postgraduate coursework 
For qualified and eligible dentists, the Sydney Dental School offers the following postgraduate coursework degrees:

 Doctor of Clinical Dentistry (Oral Medicine)
 Doctor of Clinical Dentistry (Oral Surgery)
 Doctor of Clinical Dentistry (Orthodontics)
 Doctor of Clinical Dentistry (Paediatric Dentistry)
 Doctor of Clinical Dentistry (Periodontics)
 Doctor of Clinical Dentistry (Prosthodontics)
 Doctor of Clinical Dentistry (Special Needs Dentistry)
 Graduate Diploma in Clinical Dentistry (Advanced Restorative)
 Graduate Certificate in Clinical Dentistry (Advanced Restorative)
 Graduate Diploma in Clinical Dentistry (Surgical Dentistry)
 Graduate Diploma in Dentistry (Oral Implants)
 Graduate Diploma in Dentistry (Conscious Sedation and Pain Control)
 Population Oral Health units of study, offered through Master of Public Health or Master of International Public Health.

Postgraduate research 
 Doctor of Philosophy (PhD)
 Master of Philosophy

Notable alumni 
 Robert Kavanaugh, dentist and George Cross recipient, BDS '50

References 
 "Benchmarking learning and teaching: developing a method." 2006. Quality Assurance in Education (Emerald Group Publishing). Editor: Tania Gerzina. Volume: 14 Issue: 2 Page: 143 – 155

External links 
 University of Sydney School of Dentistry

Dental schools in Australia
Educational institutions established in 1901
1901 establishments in Australia